Estadio Insular was a multi-use stadium in Las Palmas, Spain. It was initially used as the stadium of UD Las Palmas matches before Estadio Gran Canaria opened in 2003. The stadium held 21,000  people and was built in 1945.

Estadio Insular was closed in 2003 and partially demolished in 2014.

External links
Information on venue
Estadios de Espana

Insular
UD Las Palmas
Buildings and structures in Las Palmas
Sports venues completed in 1945
Sports venues demolished in 2014